Marion Deplanque (born 1 May 1981) is a French sailor. She competed in the Yngling event at the 2004 Summer Olympics.

References

External links
 

1981 births
Living people
French female sailors (sport)
Olympic sailors of France
Sailors at the 2004 Summer Olympics – Yngling
People from Saint-Dizier
Sportspeople from Haute-Marne
21st-century French women